Tinderbox is a rural residential locality in the local government area of Kingborough in the Hobart region of Tasmania. The 2016 census has a population of 394 for the state suburb of Tinderbox.

History
Tinderbox was gazetted as a locality in 1961. The locality is said to be named after a sterling silver tinderbox found on the beach in the 1830s.

Geography
North-West Bay forms the western boundary, D'Entrecasteaux Channel the southern, and the Derwent River the eastern.

Road infrastructure
The C624 route (Tinderbox Road) enters from the north and runs south-west, south, east and north, thus completing almost a complete loop of the locality before exiting in the north-east.

References

Localities of Kingborough Council
Towns in Tasmania